{{Chembox
| verifiedrevid =
| OtherNames = Chlorodifluorophosphorus oxide, difluorophosphoryl chloride, phosphoryl chloride
| ImageFile = Phosphoryl chloride difluoride.png
|Section1=
|Section2=
| Section3 = {{Chembox Structure
| Structure_ref = at 120 K
| CrystalStruct = Orthorhombic
| SpaceGroup = ''Pnma| PointGroup = 
| LattConst_a = 13.243
| LattConst_b = 5.595
| LattConst_c = 9.918
| LattConst_alpha = 
| LattConst_beta = 
| LattConst_gamma = 
| LattConst_ref =
| LattConst_Comment = 
| UnitCellVolume = 734.9
| UnitCellFormulas = 8
| Coordination = 
| MolShape = tetrahedral
| Dipole = 
  }}
|Section8=
}}Phosphoric chloride difluoride POF2Cl is a colourless gas. At one atmosphere pressure the gas condenses to a liquid at 3.1°C and freezes at −96.4.
Alternate names are difluorophosphoryl chloride or phosphoryl chloride difluoride'''.

Properties
The critical temperature of POF2Cl is 150.6 at a critical pressure of 43.4 atmospheres.
The density of the liquid at 0 °C is 1.6555 g/cm3.

The shape of the molecules in POF2Cl is tetrahedral. The P-O distance is 1.426 Å, Both P-F distances are 1.514 Å, and the P-Cl distance is 1.940 Å. The O–P–F angle is 114.09°, the F–P–F angle is 101.2°, the O–P–Cl angle is 118.85°, and the F–P-Cl angle 103.22°. In the solid form, there are two inequivalent molecular positions. The O atom from one is close to the chlorine atom on the other position aligned roughly on the c-axis. Along the b-axis there is a zigzag of O atoms close to a P atom in the other position.

The density of the solid is as calculated from crystal data is 2.177 g/cm3.

In the 31P-NMR spectrum (in H3PO4), the phosphorus atom of POClF2 is a triplet at 15 ppm.

When mixed with HCl, exchange of halogen atoms between molecules is catalysed, and POCl3, POCl2F, and POF3 end up in the mixture. HCl can end up in the product due to the starting materials, or contamination by water, and must be removed if POF2F is to be stored.

Production
Phosphoric chloride difluoride can be made by the reaction of liquid phosphorus pentachloride with phosphorodifluoridic acid HPO2F2 or diphosphoridic tetrafluoride P2O3F4. This reaction takes place at room temperature up to 60°C. The POF2Cl bubbles off as a gas, and can be condensed by cooling with dry ice-acetone mixture.

Another starting point is from potassium difluorphosphate KPO2F2.

Other less efficient methods involve fluorinating POCl3 using fluoride salts like SbF3 or NaF. But a mixture of fluorides results from these reactions. An even cheaper source is NaCl, CaF2 and P4O10 mixture heated to 500°. Industrial scale manufacture is possible with a HF reaction with POCl3.

References

Phosphorus oxohalides